Red House Painters were an American rock band, formed in San Francisco, California in 1988. They were one of the most prominent acts associated with the slowcore/sadcore subgenre. Fronted by primary songwriter Mark Kozelek (vocals, guitar), the band also included drummer Anthony Koutsos and bass guitarist Jerry Vessel. Guitarists Gorden Mack and Phil Carney both performed with the band during separate six-year tenures.

In 2001, Red House Painters quietly dissolved, with Koutsos, Vessel and Carney continuing to record and perform with Kozelek under his new guise Sun Kil Moon until 2010.

History
While in Atlanta, Georgia, Ohio-born Kozelek became friends with Anthony Koutsos, a drummer. He then moved to San Francisco, California, adding guitarist Gorden Mack and bassist Jerry Vessel to complete the line-up for Red House Painters. After forming, the group played the San Francisco scene extensively, and recorded demos from 1989 to 1992. The band were signed to 4AD in 1992, on the strength of a demo tape passed to 4AD boss Ivo Watts-Russell by American Music Club frontman Mark Eitzel.

Between September 1992 and March 1995, the band released three LPs, one double LP, and one EP. Their first 4AD release was an album made up of demos entitled Down Colorful Hill. In 1993, the group came out with two self-titled records (now commonly referred to as Rollercoaster and Bridge because of their cover artwork).

In early 1994, they released an EP entitled Shock Me, featuring two cover versions of an Ace Frehley-written KISS song. The introspective Ocean Beach followed in spring 1995. Founding guitarist Gorden Mack left shortly after the album's release, and he was replaced shortly thereafter by Phil Carney.

While Kozelek was beginning work on a solo project, he parted ways with 4AD after a tumultuous relationship, so Songs for a Blue Guitar was eventually released on Island Records subsidiary Supreme Recordings/Polygram in summer 1996. The album featured lengthy guitar jams and cover songs, and was the band's biggest seller in the U.S. By early 1998, their sixth album was completed. However, the band was beginning to dissolve, and major label mergers during the late 1990s would leave the record in limbo; it was not until 2001 that Old Ramon was issued on the Sub Pop label.

Dissolution and post-breakup
Prior to the release of Old Ramon, Kozelek released a solo seven-song EP entitled Rock 'n' Roll Singer in 2000. The record consisted of three original acoustic compositions with minor full-band arrangements and four covers (three from Bon Scott-era AC/DC, and John Denver's "Around and Around") that further revealed Kozelek's fascination with 1970s classic rock. Six months later, Kozelek released his first solo album, What's Next to the Moon, which was made up entirely of acoustic covers of even more Bon Scott-era AC/DC songs, including re-recorded versions of the tracks that had appeared on the previous EP. The record was uncharacteristic of Kozelek (though he was prone to covering songs by his favorite artists) in that it is one of the shortest full-length albums of his to date, clocking in at just over thirty minutes. Both the EP and album were released by Badman Recordings.

4AD would release the best-of package, Retrospective, in July 1999. Kozelek subsequently contributed to the AIDS benefit album The Shanti Project Collection, and organized and appeared on Take Me Home: A Tribute to John Denver, a John Denver tribute album (along with like-minded artists like Bonnie 'Prince' Billy, Low, and The Innocence Mission). He also dabbled in acting, playing small parts in the Cameron Crowe films Almost Famous and Vanilla Sky, as well as appearing more prominently as a rock musician alongside Jason Schwartzman in the 2005 Steve Martin vehicle Shopgirl.

Phil Carney occasionally accompanies Kozelek on tour dates, playing second guitar. Drummer Anthony Koutsos is also a real estate agent in San Francisco.

Sun Kil Moon

In 2003, Kozelek and Koutsos, along with Geoff Stanfield and Tim Mooney, reformed as Sun Kil Moon, releasing the acclaimed album Ghosts of the Great Highway on Jetset Records. In a 2005 interview with The Onion'''s AV Club, Kozelek confirmed that he considered Sun Kil Moon essentially a continuation of Red House Painters, but that he changed the band name to grab the interest of critics who had gotten bored with, or stopped paying attention to, his previous band.

Musical style
The band's sound has been described as slowcore, indie rock, sadcore, folk rock and alternative rock.

Members
Former members
 Mark Kozelek – vocals, guitar (1988–2001)
 Anthony Koutsos – drums (1988–2001)
 Jerry Vessel – bass guitar (1988–2001)
 Gorden Mack – guitar (1988–1995)
 Phil Carney – guitar (1995–2001)

Discography

Studio albumsDown Colorful Hill (14 September 1992)Red House Painters aka Rollercoaster (24 May 1993)Red House Painters aka Bridge (18 October 1993)Ocean Beach (27 March 1995)Songs for a Blue Guitar (23 July 1996)Old Ramon (10 April 2001)

Compilation albumsRetrospective (19 July 1999)Red House Painters (a 6LP vinyl box set collecting the 4AD albums and Shock Me EP; Record Store Day exclusive) (18 April 2015)

Singles and EPsShock Me EP (28 February 1994)’Local Anesthetic’ KFOG Studios, SAN Francisco, December 3rd 1995. (Live) (14 February 2020)

Promo singles
"Mistress" (May 1993)
"I Am a Rock"/"New Jersey" (October 1993)
"Summer Dress" (April 1995)
"All Mixed Up" (July 1996)
"Make Like Paper" (February 1997)

Soundtracks and songs in films
 "Have You Forgotten" (in Vanilla Sky)
 "Japanese to English" (in Amateur)
 "All Mixed Up" (in Excess Baggage)
 "Song for a Blue Guitar" (in The Girl Next Door)
 "Around and Around" (in Tarnation)
 "Katy Song" (in Totally Fucked Up)
 "Priest Alley Song" (in The Line)
 "Song for a Blue Guitar" (in Togetherness "For the Kids": S02E08, Series Finale)
 "Katy Song" (in the 2018 movie of Juliet, Naked by Nick Hornby

Appearances on various artists compilationsMilkshake – A CD to Benefit the Harvey Milk Institute on timmi-kat ReCoRDS (1998)Shanti Project Collection on Badman/Symbiotic Records (1999)Take Me Home: A Tribute to John Denver'' on Badman Records (2000)

References

External links
 The official Sun Kil Moon/Mark Kozelek/Red House Painters website
 The official Mark Kozelek website
 The official Caldo Verde Records website

1989 establishments in California
4AD artists
Sadcore and slowcore groups
Indie rock musical groups from California
Folk rock groups from California
Alternative rock groups from California
Musical groups established in 1989
Musical groups disestablished in 2001
Musical groups from San Francisco
Musical quintets